Rhachistia is a genus of air-breathing land snails, terrestrial pulmonate gastropod mollusks in the family Cerastidae. 

The genus Rhachistia is found in Eastern Africa and Asia.

Species 
Species in the genus Rhachistia include:
 Rhachistia adumbratus (L. Pfeiffer, 1855)
 Rhachistia aldabrae (von Martens, 1898) - Aldabra banded snail - assumed extinct since 2000, small population found 2014
 Rhachistia bengalensis (Lamarck, 1822)
 Rhachistia boehmi (E. von Martens, 1895)
 Rhachistia braunsii (von Martens, 1869) (synonym: Rhachidina braunsi (von Martens, 1869))
 Rhachistia catenata (E. von Martens, 1860)
 Rhachistia chiradzuluensis (E.A. Smith, 1899)
 Rhachistia conformalis Sutcharit, Naggs & Panha, 2010
 Rhachistia dubiosa (Sturany, 1898)
 Rhachistia erlangeri (Kobelt, 1910)
 Rhachistia festiva (Connolly, 1925)
 Rhachistia ganalensis (Kobelt, 1910)
 Rhachistia hildebandti (von Martens, 1878)
 Rhachistia histrio (Pfeiffer, 1855)
 Rhachistia infracincta (Gould, 1850)
 Rhachistia lilacina Connolly, 1930
 Rhachistia melanacme (L. Pfeiffer, 1855)
 Rhachistia moluensis (Kobelt, 1910)
 Rhachistia mozambicensis (L. Pfeiffer, 1846)
 Rhachistia picturata (Morelet, 1889)
 Rhachistia praetermissa (W. T. Blanford & H. F. Blanford, 1861)
 Rhachistia pulchra (Gray, 1825)
 Rhachistia rhodotaenia (von Martens, 1901) - type species of the genus Rhachistia
 Rhachistia rochebruniana (Bourguignat, 1883)
 Rhachistia rorkorensis (Kobelt, 1910)
 Rhachistia sanguinea (Benson, 1857)
 Rhachistia spilogramma (E. von Martens, 1860)
 Rhachistia sticta (E. von Martens, 1860)
 Rhachistia sulphurea (Tomlin & Peile, 1930)
 Rhachistia trutta (W. T. Blanford, 1866)
 Rhachistia vesiculata (Benson, 1859)
Synonyms
 Rhachistia praetermissus (W. T. Blanford & H. F. Blanford, 1861): synonym of Rhachistia praetermissa (W. T. Blanford & H. F. Blanford, 1861) (incorrect gender ending)
 Rhachistia pulcher (Gray, 1825): synonym of Rhachistia pulchra (Gray, 1825) (incorrect gender ending)
 Rhachistia sanguineus (Benson, 1857): synonym of Rhachistia sanguinea (Benson, 1857) (incorrect grammatical agreement of specific epithet)
 Rhachistia vesiculatus (Benson, 1859): synonym of Rhachistia vesiculata (Benson, 1859)  (incorrect grammatical agreement of specific epithet)

References

 Connolly, M. (1925). The non-marine Mollusca of Portuguese East Africa. Transactions of the Royal Society of South Africa, 12 (3): 105-220, pl. 4-8. Cape Town.
 Tomlin, J.R.; Peile, A.J. (1930). Eorrhachis a new genus of bulimoild snails. Proceedings of the Malacological Society of London. 19: 153-154
 Iredale, T. (1933). Systematic notes on Australian land shells. Records of the Australian Museum. 19(1): 37-59

External links
 Iredale, T. (1933). Systematic notes on Australian land shells. Records of the Australian Museum. 19(1): 37-59
 https://archive.org/stream/newcaledonianlan413sole#page/448/mode/2up

Cerastidae